Fischer Behar Chen Well Orion & Co. ("FBC")  is among Israel's leading and largest law firms. The firm specializes in commercial law.

History 
Fischer Behar Chen Well Orion & Co ("FBC") was founded in 1958 by Isachar Fischer (1929-2013).
FBC was awarded the 2015 Israel Law Firm of the Year by IFLR.

Community activism 
FBC operates the ‘Senior Citizen Support and Social Facilitation Clinic’ in collaboration with the Interdisciplinary Center Herzliya.  Since the project began in 2011,  law students have gained practical experience while assisting senior citizens and Holocaust survivors in realizing their rights.

FBC encourages pro bono projects and supports non-profit organizations.

References

External links
 FBC Homepage
 Attorneys
 Alumni
 News-publications
 Contact
 IFLR 1000 Ranking
 Legal Articles

Law firms established in 1958
Law firms of Israel
1958 establishments in Israel